Francisco Javier Cruz Jiménez (born 24 May 1966) is a Mexican former professional footballer who played for Monterrey and Tigres UANL, becoming one of the few players to be successful in both professional teams from Monterrey. He is nicknamed El Abuelo, which means "The Grandfather".

He also played for a short time in Spain, for CD Logroñés

He scored many goals for both Rayados and Tigres, even in the Clásico Regiomontano, where he became an idol of the city. Because of this, he is loved by fans of both teams, a rarity in the competing atmosphere of Monterrey.

Early life
Born in Cedral, Cruz moved to Monterrey at the age of 5. Cruz is the 8th youngest of 10 children. Although Cruz demonstrated a passion and skill for the sport, his dad discouraged him from pursuing a career in football.

Club career

C.F. Monterrey
He was instrumental in the conquest of the first championship for Rayados. Topscorer for that Mexico 86 tournament (tied with Sergio Lira from Tampico with 14 goals). He also served the assist to Sergio "Alvin" Perez's goal that kept the team from being relegated in May 1999.

Tigres UANL
He played with Tigres UANL for a while, where he scored many goals. He was instrumental in returning the team to the First Division after its privatization.

In April 1998, he signed with the San Antonio Pumas of the USISL.

International career

"El Abuelo" Cruz also played several games with Mexico, including the 1986 FIFA World Cup quarterfinal against West Germany in the Estadio Universitario of Monterrey. In extra time, he scored a goal that the referee annulled due to an offside ruling involving another player. The game ended on penalty kicks with Mexico eliminated.

He missed the 1994 FIFA World Cup due to an injury which he suffered by scoring the goal that qualified Mexico into the competition.

|-
| 1. || May 13, 1987 || Toluca, Mexico ||  || 6–0 || Win || Olympic Games Qualification
|- 
| 2. || February 10, 1993 || Monterrey, Mexico ||  || 2–0 || Win || Friendly
|- 
| 3. || May 9, 1993 || Toronto, Canada ||  || 2–1 || Win || 1994 FIFA World Cup qualification
|}

Retirement
He retired as a player on May 9, 1999.

As of April 16, 2006. He tried to get a Team as a coach, but he never got to be one, He also started working with Tigres UANL, as a recruiter but he let that down also, According to an interview, he aspires to coach a team in the Liga de Ascenso.

Personal life
Cruz gave himself the nickname El Abuelo in his teenage years in honor of his late grandfather.

In an interview, Cruz claimed to have fell into a depression following his retirement. His mental state worsened following the death of his mother due to a heart attack in 2004 and his father's death the year later. Shortly after the death of his parents, Cruz developed an eating disorder and reached a weight of 313 pounds.  Cruz underwent gastric bypass surgery after being diagnosed with high blood pressure and diabetes.

Cruz has three daughters from a previous marriage.

References

External links
 

1966 births
Living people
Footballers from San Luis Potosí
Association football forwards
Mexico under-20 international footballers
Mexico international footballers
1986 FIFA World Cup players
C.F. Monterrey players
CD Logroñés footballers
Tigres UANL footballers
Atlante F.C. footballers
San Antonio Pumas players
Liga MX players
La Liga players
USISL players
Mexican expatriate footballers
Mexican expatriate sportspeople in Spain
Expatriate footballers in Spain
Mexican expatriate sportspeople in the United States
Expatriate soccer players in the United States
Mexican footballers